Bagma Legislative Assembly constituency is one of the 60 Legislative Assembly constituencies of Tripura state in India.

It is part of Gomati district and is reserved for candidates belonging to the Scheduled Tribes.

Members of the Legislative Assembly

Election results

2018

See also
 List of constituencies of the Tripura Legislative Assembly
 Gomati district

References

Gomati district
Assembly constituencies of Tripura